The Chihuahua Savage, also known as Savage CUU, are a Mexican professional indoor soccer team based in Chihuahua, Chihuahua. Founded in 2019, the team made its debut in the Major Arena Soccer League 2 with the 2019–20 season, which was ended early due to COVID-19 pandemic.  Originally scheduled to return to the M2 for the 2021–22 season, the Savage were instead given membership to the Major Arena Soccer League, replacing the Soles de Sonora.

Year-by-year

Players

Active roster

References

External links
 

Mexican indoor football teams
Major Arena Soccer League teams
2019 establishments in Mexico
Association football clubs established in 2019
Sports teams in Chihuahua City